The Young Man from the Ragtrade is a 1926 German silent comedy film directed by Richard Löwenbein and starring Curt Bois, Maria Paudler, and Frida Richard. Bois' character of an ambitious young man was closely modelled on the early film appearances of Ernst Lubitsch.

Cast

References

Bibliography

External links

1926 films
German comedy films
Films of the Weimar Republic
German silent feature films
Films directed by Richard Löwenbein
German black-and-white films
1926 comedy films
Silent comedy films
1920s German films